Mokronos may refer to the following places:
Mokronos, Greater Poland Voivodeship (west-central Poland)
Mokronos, Łobez County in West Pomeranian Voivodeship (north-west Poland)
Mokronos, Pyrzyce County in West Pomeranian Voivodeship (north-west Poland)